= Technical tap =

== See also ==
- The dictionary definition of percussive maintenance at Wiktionary
- Maintenance
